Waw or WAW may refer to:

 Waw (letter), a letter in many Semitic abjads
 Waw, the velomobile
 Another spelling for the town Wau, Sudan
Waw Township, Burma
Warsaw Chopin Airport, an international airport serving Warsaw, Poland (IATA airport code)

Acronyms
Warsaw, capital city of the Republic of Poland
 Watchful waiting (watch and wait)
We Are Wolves, a Quebec indie rock band
Wild Atlantic Way, a tourism route in Ireland
 William Allen White, an American newspaper editor
 Wired All Wrong, a band
Women are wonderful effect
Women's Archive Wales
World Association of Wrestling
 World at War (disambiguation)
 The World Atlas of Wine
 Call of Duty: World at War, a video game
 "We Are the World", Michael Jackson's and associates' song
 Wings and Wheels format of the VintageAirRally
 Write after write (WAW) hazard, a data dependency hazard
Wuzheng Auto Works, a brand of trucks owned by the Shandong Wuzheng Group CO., LTD
Survivor: Winners at War, the 40th season of American reality competition Survivor

Call signs and codes

 WAW (TV station)
 Warsaw Chopin Airport 
 Golden West Network

See also
Wau (disambiguation)